Michael Augustine Corrigan (August 13, 1839May 5, 1902) was an American prelate of the Roman Catholic Church who served as the third archbishop of New York from 1885 to 1902.

Early life
Michael Augustine Corrigan was born August 13, 1839, in Newark, New Jersey, the fifth of nine children of Thomas and Mary English Corrigan, both of whom had emigrated from Ireland. Thomas Corrigan owned a retail grocery and liquor business in Newark, and the family's well-to-do status allowed Michael to pursue his educational interests. He attended St. Mary's College in Wilmington, Delaware, from 1853 to 1855, Mount Saint Mary's University in Emmitsburg, Maryland from 1855 to 1857, spent a year in Europe, and received his bachelor's degree from Mount Saint Mary's in 1859. He became a member of the first class at the North American College in Rome, was ordained to the priesthood in September 1863 at the Basilica of St. John Lateran, and received a doctorate of divinity in 1864.

Corrigan returned to New Jersey in 1864, where he joined the faculty at Seton Hall College and the Immaculate Conception Seminary, both in South Orange, as professor of theology and history. He soon achieved a reputation within the hierarchy for sound scholarship, and he also provided pastoral care to Catholics in the Seton Hall vicinity. When Bernard J. McQuaid left Seton Hall in 1869 to assume his duties as bishop of the Diocese of Rochester, Corrigan succeeded him as college president and also became vicar general of the Diocese of Newark.

Bishop of Newark
Corrigan succeeded James Roosevelt Bayley as bishop of Newark, becoming the second ordinary of the diocese. He was consecrated bishop on May 4, 1873. The diocese encompassed the entire state of New Jersey during Corrigan's tenure. He administered diocesan affairs during a time of rapid population growth, Roman Catholic institutional development, immigration from Ireland and Germany, and considerable urbanization in the northern part of the state.

When boys sent to state institutions were not allowed to attend Mass, the Bishop offered to provide  clergy, was refused. He then established The Catholic Protectory in Denville, where the boys were taught skills and trades.

Archbishop of New York
Corrigan was appointed Coadjutor Archbishop to John Cardinal McCloskey of New York on October 1, 1880, with the titular see of Petra, and succeeded to the archbishopric on October 10, 1885, serving as archbishop until his death.

Corrigan's career in New York proved controversial on a number of levels. He aligned himself closely with his former mentor, Bernard J. McQuaid and has been considered one of the leaders of the "conservative" movement within the American Catholic hierarchy. He proved to be a strong supporter of national parishes and parochial schools, a vocal opponent of John Ireland, James Gibbons and other bishops who advocated "Americanization" within the Catholic Church.  Within the American hierarchy, he was the closest supporter of Pope Leo XIII on Testem benevolentiae nostrae. He also proved unpopular with many bishops for his involvement in backstage intrigue at the Vatican.

Within the Archdiocese of New York his most serious controversy involved his conflict with Father Edward McGlynn.  During the 1886 mayoral campaign in New York City, the outspoken McGlynn supported Henry George, the candidate of the United Labor Party who proved popular with labor organizers, radicals, socialists, and Irish nationalists. Corrigan himself had been very close to Tammany Hall and ordered McGlynn to refrain from politics. McGlynn refused, continued to clash with the bishop, and ultimately was removed as pastor of St. Stephen's Church in New York. McGlynn was summoned to Rome but refused on the grounds of ill health and was excommunicated in 1887. The censure was eventually lifted in 1892. This highly public scandal took its toll on Corrigan and contributed to his poor relationships with an influential group of New York intellectual priests. His greatest accomplishment probably involved the building of a new seminary, St. Joseph's Seminary, Dunwoodie.

In 1897, Edgardo Mortara preached in St. Patrick's Cathedral New York City, but the Archbishop of New York told the Holy See that he opposed Mortara's efforts to evangelize the Jews on the grounds that such efforts might embarrass the Church in the view of the United States government.

Corrigan was rebuked by the Vatican in 1887 for neglecting the spiritual needs of the surge of Italian immigrants settling in New York and for treating them in a humiliating way. Italians were neither permitted to attend Mass at Irish churches nor construct their own churches, instead being permitted to say Mass only in the basements of Irish churches. Corrigan justified this exclusion on the grounds that the Italians were "not very clean" and would drive down revenues unless segregated from the Irish.

He also had invited Mother Cabrini to New York, but had to withdraw his invitation. By then Mother Cabrini and her missionaries had already embarked on their sea voyage to New York.

Corrigan slipped and fell when inspecting the excavation of the seminary in 1902. He contracted pneumonia during his convalescence and died. He was interred in the crypt under the altar of St. Patrick's Cathedral.

See also
Archdiocese of New York#Ordinaries

References

Sources
Joseph F. Mahoney and Peter J. Wosh, The Diocesan Journal of Michael Augustine Corrigan, Bishop of Newark, 1872–1880 (Newark: New Jersey Historical Society, 1987)
Carl D. Hinrichsen, "The History of the Diocese of Newark, 1873–1901," (Ph.D. diss., Catholic University of America, 1962)
Robert Emmet Curran, Michael Augustine Corrigan and the Shaping of Conservative Catholicism in America, 1878–1902 (NY: Arno Press, 1978)
Thomas Shelley, The Archdiocese of New York: A Bicentennial History, 1808–2008 (France: Editions du Signe, 2007)

1839 births
1902 deaths
19th-century Roman Catholic archbishops in the United States
20th-century Roman Catholic archbishops in the United States
American Roman Catholic clergy of Irish descent
St. Mary's College (Delaware) alumni
Mount St. Mary's University alumni
Seton Hall University faculty
Clergy from New York City
Roman Catholic archbishops of New York
Burials at St. Patrick's Cathedral (Manhattan)
Roman Catholic bishops of Newark